Visitor health insurance, also known as visitor medical insurance, is a form of short-term travel medical insurance policy that visitors to any country purchase to obtain coverage protection for accidental injury or sickness or illness that occurs during their stay in the host country.

Visitor health insurance is a form of travel medical insurance and offers health coverage for relatives or parents visiting USA, or for travel protection to visit any country for any reason, business or personal. This type of private health coverage for visitors is purchased as a short term health plan that provides medical coverage beyond national borders, and only for the duration of travel or stay outside home country. These visitor health insurance plans also provide medical evacuation and repatriation benefits as part of the covered features.

Visitor health insurance is one of the mandated types of coverages for certain foreign nationals who are temporary visitors to USA, as per a Presidential proclamation on October 4, 2019. Travelers from certain nations visiting the European Schengen states, UAE, etc. are currently required to provide proof of coverage to qualify for a visitor visa. 

Visitors to the United States are typically not eligible to purchase health insurance coverage like citizens and permanent residents. Only immigrants, who are not temporary visitors to USA, are eligible to purchase coverage in the new American government-run healthcare exchange marketplace. Exchange visitors might become eligible for plans under PPACA after two years.

Types 
Visitors insurance plans are broadly classified as below:

Limited or scheduled benefit plan 

Limited or scheduled benefit plans are also known as basic visitor insurance plans. They are generally low-cost, and pay for covered expenses up to an amount on a pre-determined or scheduled benefit table available in the plan brochure which can be reviewed before purchase of the policy.

Comprehensive coverage plan 
 
Comprehensive coverage plans pay a percentage amount for each eligible expense. Typically, these plans will cover up to 70–90% up to the first $5,000 on a policy, then 100% thereafter. Comprehensive coverage plans typically offer more benefits than basic plans, and also offer coverage for acute onset of pre-existing conditions.

Exclusions  
Common exclusions are: pre-existing conditions, maternity care, childbirth, preventative care (immunizations, regular check-ups, physical exams, etc.), prescription eye exams and glasses, cosmetic procedures, and dental work not related to an accident/emergency.

Acute onset of symptoms 
Most insurance companies don't offer pre-existing condition coverage, but many plans do offer acute onset coverage, age and other exclusions apply. There are a lot of exceptions that may apply when it comes to the acute onset clause. For most insurance companies, the insured must seek medical attention within 12 or 24 hour window after initial symptoms manifestation in order to be considered acute-onset relapse or recurrence of pre-existing conditions.

References

Health insurance
Travel insurance